Semisi Telefoni (born 22 December 1982) is a New Zealand born Tongan rugby union player.  He played for Auckland from 2004 to 2005. He debuted for Tonga against Japan in 2008. He played for French club SU Agen from 2009 to 2015, and since 2015 has played for US Carcassonne.

References

External links
ESPN Scrum Profile
Agen Profile

1982 births
Living people
Rugby union props
Tonga international rugby union players
New Zealand sportspeople of Tongan descent
New Zealand expatriate rugby union players
Expatriate rugby union players in France
SU Agen Lot-et-Garonne players
New Zealand expatriate sportspeople in France
US Carcassonne players